Daud Khan Panni (? – 6 September 1715) or simply as Daud Khan was a Mughal commander, Nawab of the Carnatic and later Nawab of Kurnool. He was an ethnic Afghan from the Panni tribe and was from Bijapur, Karnataka.

Life

In 1703, Daud Khan was appointed as the Nawab of the Carnatic. Before he became Nawab, the Emperor Aurangazeb appointed him as a leading commander of the Mughal Army in 1701, while Zulfikhar Ali Khan was the Nawab.

Daud Khan made his bases at Arcot and often received assistance from Asaf Jah I the Faujdar of the Carnatic and Talikota. During his tenure, he made frequent visits to Santhome and tried to develop it. But due to the efforts of Thomas Pitt, the then Governor of the British East India Company, Daud Khan had to defer his plans.

Like Zulfikhar Ali Khan, Daud Khan also enjoyed the confidence of the Emperor Aurangazeb and had control over all the territories south of the River Krishna. In one of his visits to Fort St. George (now Chennai), the streets were lined with soldiers. The line of soldiers was from the St. Thome Gate up to the Fort and the center of the inner Fort was occupied by train bands. The Governor, Thomas Pitt, conducted him into the Fort, carried him up to his lodgings. Such was the respect he commanded with the East India Company.

Conflicts with the British East India Company

In 1702, it is probably believed that the Mughal Emperor Aurangzeb ordered Daud Khan the Mughal Empire's local Subedar (lieutenant), to besiege and blockade Fort St. George for more than three months, the governor of the fort Thomas Pitt was instructed by the British East India Company to vie for peace.

Thomas Pitt began garrisoning British East India Company forts by raising regiments of local Sepoy's by hiring from Hindu warrior castes, he armed them with the latest weapons and positioned them under the command of British officers to save Madras, his base of operations from further Mughal harassment.

On 5 October 1708, Daud Khan issued a Firman granting the English East India Company and the five villages of Tiruvottiyur, Nungambakkam, Vysarpady, Kathiwakam and Sattangadu west of Tiruvottiyur.

In 1710, Daud Khan was recalled to Delhi to discharge more responsible work as Commander-in-Chief of the Mughal Army. He was appointed to Viceroy of the Deccan.

On 6 September 1715, Husain Ali Khan awaited the encounter with Daud Khan. Daud Khan, unfortunately, was killed by a stray bullet in this battle and died. He was winning the battle until he died. His death led to his army being defeated in the battle near Burhanpur.

War elephants
In 1703, the Mughal commander at Coromandel, Daud Khan Panni spent 10,500 coins to purchase 30 to 50 war elephants from Ceylon. These purchases were acknowledged by Vimaladharmasurya II of Kandy.

See also
Mughal Empire
Aurangzeb
Nawabs of Arcot

References

Titles held
Commander-in-Chief of Mughal Army under Aurangazeb.

Nawabs of the Carnatic
Mughal Empire
Indian Muslims
1715 deaths
Year of birth unknown
Subahdars of Gujarat
Pashtun people